A tremble dance is a dance performed by forager honey bees of the species Apis mellifera to recruit more receiver honey bees to collect nectar from the workers.

History of discovery
The tremble dance was first described by Karl von Frisch in the 1920s (who was also first to describe the waggle dance), but no light was shed on its function until 1993 when Wolfgang Kirschner discovered that, when performed, the dance stopped nearby workers from flying to gather more nectar.

Function
The tremble dance of the honeybee is similar to the waggle dance, but is used by a forager when the foraging bee perceives a long delay in unloading its nectar or a shortage of receiver bees, sometimes due to low numbers of receiver bees. It may also spread the scent released during the forager's waggle dance.  Like the waggle dance, the tremble dance is likely one of two "primary regulation mechanisms" for regulating bee colony behavior at the group level, and one of four or five observed mechanisms known to be used by honeybees to change the task allocation among worker bees.

Linkage to ethanol consumption
The consumption of ethanol by foraging bees has been shown to increase the occurrence of the tremble dance while decreasing the occurrence of the waggle dance.

See also 
Bee learning and communication
Bee piping
Eusociality
Grooming dance
Waggle dance

References

Sources and further reading 
Arnold et al. (September 2002) Intra-Colonial Variability in the Dance Communication in Honeybees (Apis mellifera). Ethology Vol. 108, Issue 9. pp. 751–761.
Biesmeijer, J. C. (May 2003) The occurrence and context of tremble dancing in free-foraging honey bees (Apis mellifera). Behavioral Ecology and Sociobiology. Volume 53, Number 6.  pp. 411–416.
Dyer, Fred C. (January 2002) The biology of the dance language. Annual Review of Entomology. Vol. 47. pp. 917–949.
Schneider, Stanley S.; Lee A. Lewis. (2003) Honey bee communication: the "tremble dance", the vibration signal and the "migration dance", in: Webster T. (Ed.) Monographs in honey bee biology. Northern Bee Books, West Yorks, Great Britain. Vol. 1, pp. 1–26.
Schneider, Stanley S.; Lee A. Lewis. (March 2004) The vibration signal, modulatory communication and the organization of labor in honey bees, Apis mellifera. Apidologie. Vol. 35, Issue 2. pp. 117–131. 
Seeley, Thomas D. (July 1997) Honey Bee Colonies are Group-Level Adaptive Units. The American Naturalist. Vol. 150, Supplement: Multilevel Selection. pp. S22-S41.
Seeley, Thomas D. (June 1999) Born to Dance. Natural History. Vol. 108, Number 6. pp. 54–57.
Takeshi, Otani. (2001) Dance performance at very near distance from the honeybee hive. Honeybee Science. Vol. 22, Number 3.  pp. 127–138.
Thom, Corinna. (2002) Dynamics and Communication Structures of Nectar Foraging in Honey bees (Apis mellifera). Dissertation zur Erlangung des naturwissenschaftlichen Doktorgrades der Bayerischen Julius-Maximilians -Universität Würzburg.

External links
 

Western honey bee behavior